Kherengan (also Romanized as Kherengān; also known as Kherengūn) is a village in Jowzar Rural District, in the Central District of Mamasani County, Fars Province, Iran. At the 2006 census, its population was 49, in 16 families.

References 

Populated places in Mamasani County